Child Genius is an American reality competition series produced by Shed Media (now Warner Bros. Television UK) along with A&E Networks in cooperation, with American Mensa. It is based on a UK program by the same name.

The show features 20 children between the ages of 8 to 12 from across the country, all competing for a $100,000 college fund and the title of Child Genius 2014. Each week the remaining competitors go head in to head in various mental challenges testing their knowledge of: Math, Spelling, Geography, Memory, the Human Body, U.S. Presidents, Vocabulary, Current Events, Zoology, Astronomy and Space, Inventions, Literature and the Arts, Earth Science and Logic. The competition is moderated by former NASA astronaut Leland D. Melvin, with additional judging provided by North American MENSA representative, Matt Stern, and Jeopardy! champion, Pam Mueller. Challenges took place at the Skirball Cultural Center in Los Angeles, California, California

The series premiered on January 6, 2015, on Lifetime.

The second season retitled as Child Genius: Battle of the Brightest premiered on January 7, 2016. This season's cast only consisted of 12 geniuses between the ages of 9 and 12. Additionally, Lisa Van Gemert (who was featured during Season 1 for asides) became the new representative for American MENSA, and Dr. Timothy Gunn replaced Pam Mueller as question validator.

Season 1

The Geniuses

Competitor Progress

Results
 Limegreen background means the genius won the competition.
 Blue background means the genius made it to the final round of the competition but did not win.
 Gold background means the genius received the highest composite score in that week's competitions.
 Silver background means the genius received the second highest composite score in that week's competitions
 Bronze background means the genius received the third highest composite score in that week's competitions
 Red background means the genius received one of the lowest composite scores and was eliminated from the competition.

Episodes

Season 2

The Geniuses

Competitor Progress

Results
 Limegreen background means the genius won the competition.
 Blue background means the genius made it to the final round of the competition but did not win.
 Gold background means the genius received the highest composite score in that week's competitions.
 Silver background means the genius received the second highest composite score in that week's competitions
 Bronze background means the genius received the third highest composite score in that week's competitions
 Red background means the genius received one of the lowest composite scores and was eliminated from the competition.

Episodes

Reception

References

External links

2015 American television series debuts
2016 American television series endings
2010s American reality television series
Lifetime (TV network) original programming
Television series by Warner Bros. Television Studios
Television series about children